R. R. Venkat  (1966/1967 – 27 September 2021) was an Indian film producer known primarily for his works in Telugu cinema. He owned the distribution house R. R. Movie Makers.

Career
In 2011, Venkat received honorary doctorate from the open International University for Complementary Medicines at University of Colombo for his contributions as a social worker.

He also made his foray into Hollywood with the 2012 English movie Divorce Invitation starring Jonathan Bennett directed by veteran S. V. Krishna Reddy which is a remake of S. V. Krishna Reddy's Srikanth and Ramya Krishnan starrer Aahwanam.

Venkat died due to "kidney-related issues" on 27 September 2021, in Hyderabad, aged 54.

Filmography

Producer
English
Divorce Invitation (2012)

Hindi
Ek Hasina Thi (2004)
James (2005)

Telugu
Andhrawala (2004)
Samanyudu  (2006)
Maayajaalam (2006)
Victory (2008)
Gundamma Gaari Manavadu (2007)
Bahumati (2007)
Kick (2009)
Prema Kavali (2010)
Don Seenu (2010)
Mirapakay (2011)
Businessman (2012)
Poola Rangadu (2012 film) (2012)
Lovely (2012)
Damarukam (2012)
Autonagar Surya (2013)
Paisa (2013)

References

External links
 

1960s births
2021 deaths
Film producers from Andhra Pradesh
Telugu film producers
Year of birth missing